The Fourteenth Doctor  is the current incarnation of the Doctor, the protagonist of the BBC science fiction television series Doctor Who. He is portrayed by Scottish actor David Tennant, who previously portrayed the Tenth Doctor and was last seen in the programme in that role in 2013.

Within the series' narrative, the Doctor is a millennia-old, alien Time Lord from the planet Gallifrey, with somewhat unknown origins, who travels in time and space in the TARDIS, frequently with companions. At the end of each incarnation's life, the Doctor regenerates; as a result, the physical appearance and aspects of the personality of the Doctor changes.

Ncuti Gatwa had previously been announced as Jodie Whittaker's successor as the programme's lead, and many reports stated he would play the Fourteenth Doctor and that Whittaker's Thirteenth Doctor would regenerate into an incarnation portrayed by Gatwa. Upon Whittaker's final appearance as the character, she instead regenerated into a form similar to that of the Tenth Doctor. This character was confirmed to be the Fourteenth Doctor, with later clarification that Gatwa would actually portray the Fifteenth Doctor following the 60th anniversary specials in November 2023.

The Fourteenth Doctor is set to appear in special episodes in 2023, executive produced by Russell T Davies, who also returns to the series having executive produced the show from 2005 to 2010.

Appearance 
The Fourteenth Doctor has the same appearance and voice as the Tenth, though slightly older, as well as a similar hairstyle. His clothes are also very similar, only with a tartan waistcoat replacing the pinstripe blazer on top of the colour, and a blue trench coat rather than the signature brown overcoat the Tenth Doctor wore. These clothes regenerated with his appearance from the Thirteenth Doctor's, rather than him choosing them like in most of his previous regenerations. Davies later explained that he wished for the Doctor's clothes to change as part of the first regeneration from a female to a male Doctor, not wanting to invite associations with drag culture by having Tennant appearing in clothing designed for Whittaker.

In an interview with BBC News following the announcement of his role reprisal, Tennant commented on his Doctor's appearance saying that "to a sort of casual viewer, I look like I'm sort of dressed in the same way as I used to be. But actually we've gone for something that's sort of the same, but different. That has echoes of the past, but it's also a bit something of the now as well."

Background 
Rwandan-Scottish actor Ncuti Gatwa was announced in May 2022 as the actor who would take over from English actress Jodie Whittaker in the role following a series of special episodes throughout 2022. During the special, "The Power of the Doctor", it was revealed following Whittaker's regeneration the Doctor had regenerated into an incarnation again portrayed by David Tennant. Tennant had previously starred in the programme as the Tenth Doctor from 2005 to 2010, and is the first actor to portray two different incarnations of the character over multiple episodes. The return of a previous actor as a new incarnation of the Doctor was previously proposed by Doctor Who creator Sydney Newman in a 1986 exchange with then BBC One controller Michael Grade after the dismissal of Colin Baker; Newman specifically envisioned Patrick Troughton, who portrayed the Second Doctor, returning for one series before regenerating into a female incarnation. Fourth Doctor actor Tom Baker had also returned in the 2013 special "The Day of the Doctor" playing The Curator, alluded as a possible incarnation of The Doctor.

Gatwa was confirmed to eventually be starring in the role as the Fifteenth Doctor, with executive producer Russell T Davies stating "The path to Ncuti's 15th Doctor is laden with mystery, horror, robots, puppets, danger and fun!"

Tennant and Catherine Tate are set to reprise their roles in three special episodes to commemorate the programme's 60th anniversary in November 2023. Yasmin Finney is also set to make her debut as Rose.

References 

Male characters in television
14
Television characters introduced in 2022
Extraterrestrial characters in television